The Invaders is a 1912 American silent Western film directed by Francis Ford and Thomas H. Ince.

Cast 
 Art Acord as Telegrapher
 William Eagle Shirt as The Sioux Chief
 Francis Ford as Colonel James Bryson
 Ethel Grandin as Colonel Bryson's Daughter
 Ann Little as Sky Star
 Ray Myers as Lieutenant White

Availability
The film was released on the DVD compilation More Treasures from American Film Archives, in 2004.

External links 
 
 
 

1912 films
1912 Western (genre) films
American black-and-white films
Articles containing video clips
Films directed by Francis Ford
Silent American Western (genre) films
1910s American films
1910s English-language films